Samuel Strain Jr. (born December 9, 1939) is an American R&B vocalist, known for his time as a member of Little Anthony and the Imperials (1958–1972; 1992–2005) and The O'Jays (1975–1992).

He holds the unusual distinction of being twice inducted into the Rock and Roll Hall of Fame: in 2005 with the O'Jays and in 2009 with Little Anthony and the Imperials.

Early life
Strain was born to Sammy Strain Sr. and Margaret Mosley in Brooklyn in 1939. He visited the Apollo Theater as a teenager, and dropped out of Alexander Hamilton High School, Brooklyn age 16.

Career

Strain formed The Chips with several friends in 1956. He sang with a tenor voice.

In 1958, Strain joined The Imperials; they later reunited with their lead singer and reformed Little Anthony and the Imperials.

From 1975 to 1992, Strain was part of The O'Jays replacing original member William Powell as he was diagnosed with colon cancer, he rejoined the Imperials, and sang with them until retiring in 2005.

Strain was twice inducted into the Rock and Roll Hall of Fame: in 2005 with the O'Jays and in 2009 with Little Anthony and the Imperials.

Personal life

Strain married the singer Yvonne Fair. He is currently married to DeBorah and has two sons.

Notes 
1.Some sources give Strain's year of birth as 1940 or 1941. However, he celebrated his 80th birthday in 2019 and most sources give 1939 as the year of birth, including the detailed biography in Echoes Of The Past magazine.

References

External links

1939 births
Living people
American soul singers
Musicians from Brooklyn
American tenors
21st-century African-American male singers
20th-century African-American male singers